A shag is a heavy long piled worsted textile. In the 17th century, the term was also used to refer to inferior silk material.

References

External links 
 A Brief History of the Shag Rug—Carini NYC (20 August 2015)

1970s fads and trends
Pile fabrics
Rugs and carpets